Oliver Harold Taylor (born March 7, 1947) is an American former professional basketball player. A  guard/forward, Taylor played college basketball at the University of Houston from 1968 until 1970. More recently, he was placed in charge of New Business for Milton Keynes-based agency elliotts.

Taylor was selected by the Cleveland Cavaliers in the 12th round of the 1970 NBA draft. Although he did not see action in the NBA, he went on to play in four ABA seasons with the New York Nets, San Diego Conquistadors, and Carolina Cougars.

Born in New York City, Taylor rode the bench in high school before jumping center against Kareem Abdul-Jabbar in college and playing against Julius Erving and Rick Barry in the ABA. Along the way, he set numerous National Junior College Athletic Association (NJCAA) records while leading San Jacinto to the 1968 national title. Taylor followed that up by lifting Houston to a Sweet 16 appearance in 1970. Taylor had a  vertical leap, which he used for dunking.

External links

1947 births
Living people
American men's basketball players
Basketball players from New York City
Carolina Cougars players
Cleveland Cavaliers draft picks
Houston Cougars men's basketball players
New York Nets players
San Diego Conquistadors players
San Jacinto Central Ravens men's basketball players
Shooting guards
Small forwards
DeWitt Clinton High School alumni